Col. Paul Whitin, (1767–1831) was an American blacksmith and pioneering industrialist who in 1826 Northbridge, Massachusetts established P Whitin and Sons, a new cotton mill with his sons. This company would grow and acquire other mills in the area. In 1831 his son John C Whitin obtained a patent for a mechanized Cotton Picker. Textile machinery would become a larger percentage of their business over time. would later become the largest maker of specialty textile machinery in the world.

Paul was born in 1767 in Roxbury,MA as Paul Whiting to Nathaniel and Sarah (Draper) Whiting . He began his career as an apprentice in Colonel James Fletcher's forge in South Northbridge. In 1793, he married Fletcher's daughter, Elizabeth (Betsey) Fletcher at which time he changed his name by dropping the “g”. They would have eight children, including five sons.

Whitin and four of his sons and their descendants would become very influential in the development of the textile industry in the Blackstone Valley area during the 19th Century, establishing or acquiring several mills throughout the Blackstone Valley area, including ones at Uxbridge, Linwood, Riverdale and Rockdale. It was the Whitin Machine Works however, which would have the greatest impact on the area and the textile industry.

In 1835, the village of South Northbridge became known as Whitinsville in his honor.

Pioneer of industry
In 1809, Whitin and his father-in-law James Fletcher and others from Northbridge and Leicester, established the Northbridge Cotton Manufacturing Company. This wood-framed spinning mill, two and one-half stories high had 200 spindles and was only the third cotton mill in the Blackstone Valley at the time.

In 1815, Whitin became a partner with Colonel Fletcher, Betsey's father, and his two brothers-in-law, Samuel and Ezra Fletcher, under the firm name of Whitin and Fletcher. Then they built a second mill with 300 spindles on the opposite side of the Mumford River. Paul Whitin then bought out the Fletcher shares in 1826 and formed a new partnership with his two sons, Paul Jr. and John Crane Whitin. The new company was called Paul Whitin and Sons. Also in 1826, a new brick mill was constructed, having 2000 spindles, which still stands today at Whitinsville, having been recently restored. The 1826 brick mill is perhaps the oldest surviving, unaltered textile mill remaining in Massachusetts. Colonel Fletcher's 1772 Blacksmith Forge is also still standing, next to the Brick Mill, on the west bank of the Mumford River.

Later on, Whitin's two other younger sons, Charles P. and James F. later also entered into the family-run business.

Whitin died in 1831. Years later, with the cotton business on a solid basis and escalating in 1845, Betsey Whitin and her sons built a new, stone textile factory, largely of granite known as the Whitinsville Cotton Mill, which gave the family business 7,500 more spindles. The Whitinsville Cotton Mill would later be used as a testing facility for new equipment developed by the Whitin Machine Works, across the street. This is now called the restored Cotton Mill Apartments, in Whitinsville.

Whitin Machine Works and the Village of Whitinsville
In 1831, Whitin's third son John Crane Whitin designed and had patented a new cotton picker machine that outperformed others in the previous mills. This was to be first of other successive inventions that would establish the Whitin Machine Works as a great textile machinery company.

In 1847, the Whitins built "The Shop," which consisted of a new textile production area that was four times larger than the brick mill. It contained machine shops, foundries, and other specialized structures.

As the family textile businesses expanded, so did the village of Whitinsville. More housing was provided by the company for new workers on North Main St. and on other side streets as Irish workers poured into the labor pool that same year (1847). Just seven years prior, John C. Whitin had developed the first of stately mansions, which had occupied land where the Whitin Gymnasium now stands. During this time also, Paul Whitin Jr. had married Sarah Chapin and built a new Italian-styled home, along with his brother in 1856.

In 1864, Betsy Whitin decided to split the family businesses among the four sons. Paul Jr. got the Rockdale and Riverdale Mills. Charles P. received the 1845 Whitinsville Cotton Mill and the 1826 brick mill. James F. got the Crown and Eagle Mill of North Uxbridge, and the land near the Whitin Railroad Depot, where he built in 1866, the Linwood Cotton Mill with his brother Charles. However, it was John C. who got The Machine Shops of 1847 (The Shop) proper, which had just been expanded along North Main Street.

The Whitin family continued to hold the Whitin Machine Works privately until 1946. By 1948, the company was operating at peak capacity, employing 5,615 men and women. However, the business began a decline over then next two decades. In 1966, Whitin Machine Works was sold to White Consolidated Industries. The plant would struggle along for another decade, when in 1976 the doors were closed.  The huge plant is now occupied by a variety of smaller businesses along both sides of the Mumford River in Whitinsville.

External links
Blackstone River Valley Article

References

People from Northbridge, Massachusetts
American textile industry businesspeople
Businesspeople from Massachusetts
American blacksmiths
1767 births
1831 deaths